Sachigo Lake 3 is a First Nations reserve in Kenora District, Ontario. It is one of the reserves of the Sachigo Lake First Nation.

References

External links
 Canada Lands Survey System

Oji-Cree reserves in Ontario
Communities in Kenora District